Propebela variabilis is a species of sea snail, a marine gastropod mollusk in the family Mangeliidae.

Description
The length of the shell varies between 9 mm and 14 mm.

Distribution
This marine species occurs off Sakhalin, Eastern Russia..

References

 Bogdanov, I. P. Mollusks of Oenopotinae subfamily (Gastropoda, Pectinibranchia, Turridae) in the seas of the USSR. Nauka, 1990.

Further reading
 

variabilis
Gastropods described in 1990